Simpson Nunatak is a nunatak, rising  northwest of Mount Roberts, on the south margin of Aitkenhead Glacier, Trinity Peninsula, Antarctica. Named by United Kingdom Antarctic Place-Names Committee (UK-APC) for Hugh W. Simpson of Falkland Islands Dependencies Survey (FIDS), a member of the Detroit Plateau reconnaissance party from Hope Bay in 1957.

References

Nunataks of Trinity Peninsula